Peter Heinrich Lambert von Hess (29 July 1792 – 4 April 1871) was a German painter, known for historic paintings, especially of the Napoleonic Wars and the Greek War of Independence.

Life
Peter von Hess initially received training from his father Carl Ernst Christoph Hess. He accompanied his younger brother Heinrich Maria to Munich in 1806, and enrolled at the Munich Academy at the age of sixteen. He also trained under Wilhelm von Kobell.

During the Napoleonic Wars, he was allowed to join the staff of General Wrede, who commanded the Bavarians in the military operations which led to the abdication of Napoleon. There he gained novel experiences of war and a taste for extensive travel. During this time, von Hess painted his first battle pieces. In 1818, he spent some time in Italy where he painted landscapes and various Italian scenes and travelled to Naples with Joseph Petzl and a group of other Bavarian artists.

In 1833, at King Ludwig I of Bavaria's request, he accompanied Otto of Greece to the newly formed Kingdom of Greece, where at Athens he gathered materials for pictures of the war of liberation. The sketches which he then made were placed, forty in number, in the Pinakothek, after being copied in wax on a large scale by Nilsen, in the northern arcades of the Hofgarten at Munich.
King Otho's entrance into Nauplia was the subject of a large and crowded canvas now in the Pinakothek, which Hess executed in person.

Evaluation
Peter von Hess' work has been evaluated positively for its execution but some have questioned its boldness and congeniality.

He is buried in the Alter Südfriedhof in Munich.

Works

Notes

References

External links

Peter-von-Hess.com
Pinakothek.de info

19th-century German painters
19th-century German male artists
German male painters
19th-century war artists
German war artists
1792 births
1871 deaths
Academy of Fine Arts, Munich alumni
German philhellenes
Burials at the Alter Südfriedhof